This article lists the history record of the Phoenix at the University of Wisconsin–Green Bay.
From 1979-2001 the Horizon League was called the Midwestern Collegiate Conference.
In 2007 the Mid-Continent Conference changed its name to the Summit League.

D-I Men's Basketball

 * Won Conference Tournament: 1995, 1994, 1991

D-I Women's Basketball

 * Won Conference Tournament: 2012, 2011, 2010, 2008, 2007, 2005, 2004, 2003, 2002, 2000, 1999, 1998, 1994

References

Green Bay Phoenix men's basketball
Green Bay
Green Bay Phoenix basketball seasons